Cape San Antonio, is a cape which forms the western extremity of the Guanahacabibes Peninsula and the western extremity of Cuba. It extends into the Yucatán Channel, and is part of the municipality of Sandino, in Pinar del Río Province. According to the International Hydrographic Organization, it marks the division point between the Caribbean Sea to the south and Gulf of Mexico to the north.

See also
 Cape Maisí
 Cape Corrientes
 Cabo San Antonio Lighthouse

References

External links
 Cape San Antonio on havanajournal.com

San Antonio
Sandino, Cuba
Geography of Pinar del Río Province